Salomón Libman (born 25 February 1984) is a Peruvian footballer who plays as a goalkeeper in the Peruvian Primera División for Universidad Técnica de Cajamarca.

Early life
Libman was born in Lima, Peru. He is 1.84 m tall, and weighs 80 kg.

Before joining Alianza Lima he played for Peruvian team Sport Boys and for Peruvian football club  Alianza Lima and SB Callao U19.

Honours

Country 
Peru national football team
 Copa America: Bronze medal 2011, 2015

Individual
Descentralizado Goalkeeper of the Year: 2010.

References

External links

1984 births
Living people
Footballers from Lima
Peruvian people of Spanish descent
Peruvian people of Romanian-Jewish descent
Association football goalkeepers
Peruvian footballers
Peru international footballers
Peruvian Primera División players
Sport Boys footballers
Club Alianza Lima footballers
Club Deportivo Universidad César Vallejo footballers
FBC Melgar footballers
Sport Huancayo footballers
Universidad Técnica de Cajamarca footballers
2011 Copa América players